Centrebus is a bus company based in Leicester operating services in Bedfordshire, Hertfordshire, Leicestershire, Lincolnshire, Nottinghamshire and Rutland.

Centrebus have a 51% shareholding in High Peak Buses and since December 2019 through company director Julian Peddle have had 100% ownership of Cheshire based D&G Bus although they currently operate as separate businesses.

History

Centrebus was founded in 2001, it was previously known as Anstey Buslines. In 2002, the businesses of inMotion, Dunstable, Lutonian, Luton and Centrebus, Leicester merged to form the basis of the business today.

Expansion
In January 2004, Centrebus acquired the St Albans operation of Blazefield although in March 2008 it was sold to Uno.
During February 2005 operations commenced around Grantham, following the closure of MASS Transit.

In June 2007, Centrebus purchased Bowers Coaches, based in Chapel-en-le-Frith, Derbyshire. Bowers operated services around Cheshire, Derbyshire and Greater Manchester. In April 2012 Centrebus transferred the business into a joint venture with the Wellglade Group to form High Peak Buses with Bowers operations relocated to Trent Barton's Dove Holes depot.

Centrebus shareholders formed Centrebus Holdings in May 2008 with Arriva taking a 40% shareholding. Centrebus Holdings was an independent company from the main business, but was managed by Centrebus on a day-to-day basis. In September 2013, Arriva bought out its partners with the West Yorkshire operations rebranded as Yorkshire Tiger and the Hinckley operations as Hinckley Bus. Despite the name, Centrebus Holdings has never had any shareholding in Centrebus, and was formed to take over K-Line and Stagecoach Huddersfield, and subsequently the Hinckley operations of Arriva Midlands.

In September 2008, Centrebus purchased the local bus operations of the Woods Coaches, Leicestershire business. In August 2009, the business of Trustybus, with operations in Essex and Hertfordshire, was acquired by Centrebus. In August 2010 Centrebus took over the operations of Judges Mini Coaches, Corby with routes serving Kettering, Milton Keynes, Welford, Wellingborough, Wicken and Yardley Gobion.

In May 2011, Centrebus took over West End Travel of Melton Mowbray and its fleet of buses and services in Melton Mowbray and Rural Rider services. In October 2011 Centrebus purchased Paul James Coaches, Saxby from Veolia Transport with 21 buses.

In July 2011 Centrebus took over the business of Kimes Buses, Folkingham. Kimes was founded in 1945 and sold in January 1997 to its employees. It operated a fleet of 23 vehicles at the time of the takeover. Its green and cream livery and the Kimes name were retained by Centrebus. In August 2013 the depot was closed with operations transferred to Centrebus' Grantham depot.

Network contraction

In November 2012, Centrebus closed its Harlow depot with most routes passing to Roadrunner Buses. The remaining routes moved to the Stevenage depot, allowing the business to consolidate its East Hertfordshire operations on a single site.

In June 2017, Centrebus closed its Saxby depot, citing rising costs and declining patronage.

In October 2019, Centrebus closed its Corby depot, citing rising costs and declining patronage.

In May 2021, Stevenage Depot was closed by Centrebus. some routes were transferred to Luton while others were transferred to other operators, with Trustybus taking some routes, Richmonds, A2b travel and Chiltern Automotive (200 shopper routes)of routes. Which then went back to Centrebus in October 2022

Depots
Centrebus currently operate from four depots across England:

 Wenlock Way for the Leicester operations,
 Tollemache Road for Grantham operations,
 Hallsteads, Dove Holes for HighPeak operations,
 Bilton Way for Luton operations/Hertfordshire routes.

Wenlock Way, Leicester is also the headquarters of Centrebus Group.

Fleet
As of June 2022 the fleet consists of 264, mostly single-deck, vehicles. Centrebus are currently rolling out a revised livery across their fleet with orange to the front of the vehicle and blue to the rear, separated by a broad white stripe.

During 2021 Leicester City Council successfully applied for £19 million of funding from the Government's ZEBRA scheme with Centrebus operating four Yutong E12 electric buses on the University Hospitals of Leicester Hospital Hopper service, Centrebus are due a further six Yutong E10 buses during late 2022 for the Leicester Outer Orbital service.

Routes 
Routes operated by Centrebus include the Rutland Flyer, Leicester Orbital, and the 747 Uppingham–Leicester.

747 
The 747 is a bus service which operates between Uppingham and Leicester, largely following the A47 road.

The bus formerly ran between Leicester and Peterborough, operated by Midland Fox. The Uppingham-Peterborough section was withdrawn and replaced by the less frequent R47 service.

In January 2017, Centrebus announced that the route was no longer commercially viable. However, the route continued operating after a £60,000 subsidy from two local councils that covered the cost of the route until January 2018. The route has continued to be subsidised by Rutland County Council and Leicestershire County Council.

References

External links

Centrebus website

Bus operators in Bedfordshire
Bus operators in Hertfordshire
Bus operators in Leicestershire
Bus operators in Lincolnshire
Bus operators in Northamptonshire
Bus operators in Nottinghamshire
Companies based in Leicester
Transport in Leicestershire
2001 establishments in England